Myophthiria is a genus of biting flies in the family of louse flies, Hippoboscidae. There are 13 known species. All species are Parasites of birds.

Distribution
Myophthiria are found worldwide with the exception of Antarctica.

Systematics
Genus Myophthiria Rondani, 1875
Species group '1' (Old World)
M. capsoides Rondani, 1878
M. lyaeoides Rondani, 1878
M. reduvioides Rondani, 1875
Species group '2' (New World)
M. fimbriata (Waterhouse, 1887)
M. neotropica Bequaert, 1943
Incertae sedis
M. figiarum Maa, 1980
M. javanica Maa, 1980
M. malayna Maa, 1980
M. neocaledonica Maa, 1980
M. neohebudarum Maa, 1980
M. queenslandae Maa, 1980
M. wilsoni Maa, 1980
M. zelanica Maa, 1980

References

Parasites of birds
Hippoboscidae
Hippoboscoidea genera
Taxa named by Camillo Rondani